The Sinnett Octagon House built in 1855 is a historic octagonal house in Muscatine, Iowa. The two-story brick home with wrap-around porch and windowed cupola is now used as an office building.

On July 18, 1974, it was added to the National Register of Historic Places.

References

Octagon houses in Iowa
Houses completed in 1855
Houses on the National Register of Historic Places in Iowa
Houses in Muscatine County, Iowa
National Register of Historic Places in Muscatine County, Iowa
Buildings and structures in Muscatine, Iowa